Walworth is a central small village with outlying farmsteads, which together constitute a scattered village in the borough of Darlington and the ceremonial county of County Durham, England. It is a civil parish which does not have a church. The population of this civil parish at the 2011 Census was 240. The nucleus of the central village is the 16th-century Walworth Castle, which is now a hotel. On the north side of the village, around North Farm, are earthworks signifying a lost settlement, grouped around a barn which was once a chapel.

Central village location and structure

Walworth and Walworth Gate are said to be on the line of the Roman road, Dere Street. The village is triangular in plan, with Walworth Castle and Walworth Park at its centre. North Farm and the lost settlement of Walworth are at the north corner; Castle farm and Tomtit Wood are at the south-west corner, and Walworth Grange and a few houses are at the south-east corner. The village used to be part of Heighington parish, but the settlement now has its own civil parish. Although there is evidence of a former chapel in the lost settlement, the village does not have a church. The population here is very low; in 2001 there were only 167 people on the electoral roll of Denton, Walworth and Houghton-le-Side who were eligible to vote at Walworth Castle polling station.

Walworth Castle

The central feature of the village, and its landmark for miles, is its very large, 16th-century mansion house built in the style of a medieval castle, which is now a hotel. It is a Grade 1 listed building, probably built by Thomas Holt in around 1600 for Thomas Jennison. It may be that earthworks and cropmarks in Walworth Park in the castle grounds signify a lost settlement associated with the one at North Farm.

History

The name "Walworth" means Welsh settlement, and it used to be known as Waleberge after the Saxons claimed it. It is thought that Walworth was planned as a village with the previous castle around 1150 by the Hansard family as part of their  estate. There is a legend that Malcolm III of Scotland destroyed the village on his way along the River Tees. Following the Black Death there was a change of ownership of the manor to the Neville family by 1367, but in 1391 Robert Hansard claimed it back. The Ayscough family acquired the manor by marriage in 1539, then Thomas Jenison bought it in 1579 when the Ayscough family had no heirs. At the death of Elizabeth Jenison in 1605, the farm stock inventory included 50 oxen besides cattle, sheep, pigs, horses and corn. In 1759 the estate left the hands of the Jenisons due to the death and debts of Ralph Jenison. From 1759 to 1831 the estate belonged to Matthew Stephenson, and then it was sold to the Aylmer family who owned it until 1931. Their descendants Neville and Charles Eade owned it from 1931 to 1950, and then it was sold in 1950 to Durham County Council. The estate was broken up and sold into private ownership in 1981, and present ownership of the village is unknown.

Historical sites

There is no evidence of prehistoric or Roman activity in this area, but the area has not been fully excavated. In May 2004 a barbed and tanged arrowhead was found at Quarry Cottage, where Newton Lane meets Walworth Road. Because this site was a quarry, the arrowhead may have been moved from its original site before it was found. In 1991 some archaeological evaluation trenches were dug next to the castle itself, in advance of hotel development; however, no traces were found of archaeological material. About  to the east of Walworth, in a field just east of Back Lane, is the site of a former post-medieval brick and tile works.

North of the village, just south of New Moor Farm and just to the west of Walworth Road, is the site of a post-medieval lime kiln. The disused limestone quarry called Quarry Hole, where Newton Lane meets Walworth Road, is post-medieval also, and it once had an associated lime kiln.  north-west of Walworth, between Newton Lane and the A68 road, is the post-medieval Paradise Cottage, once known as Hood's Cottage, with an associated well. There is an overgrown well on the west side of Walworth Road and level with the castle gate, at the north end of Tomtit Wood. It is made of stone with a trough to collect water. The evidence for this is from field names on tithe maps and manuscripts. There is a late 18th- or early 19th-century listed ice house to the east of Quarry End, at Quarry Hole. It is built into a bank, and has a partially-collapsed barrel-vaulted passage connected to a deep, egg-shaped cavity intended for the ice. It is built of coursed rubble and the inside is brick-lined. On the east side of Walworth Grange are a Grade II listed late 18th- or early 19th-century threshing barn and gin gang. They are built of limestone with pantiled roofs, and the gin gang is semi-octagonal with square piers and later infilled walls.

Parkside Farmhouse at Castle Farm is a listed building, built in the early 19th century with squared limestone walls and purple slate roof. On its south side is a large 19th-century, two-storey, pantiled, square-plan dovecote which is listed separately along with some sheds, including a possible bee bole. The wall has flat coping and is L-shaped, surrounding two sides of the farmhouse. The wall may have contained flues to heat soft fruit. Also on the south side of the farm house is another set of early 19th-century listed sheds and barn with assorted roofing: asbestos, pantiles and stone flags. The single-storey sheds contain blocked arches. There is also a listed 19th-century haybarn and former potato shed on the south side of the farmhouse. The haybarn is built of squared limestone and sandstone with brick arches.

Lost settlement
At the north end of the village, the fields on the east and west sides of the North Farm buildings contain earthworks signifying a lost settlement. There are some isolated ruins and two rows of building foundations, and ditches and banks which form enclosures. The chapel was built in 1180 of squared and coursed rubble, and has since been incorporated into the northernmost farm building with blocked original openings and indications of the original door and window still visible, although it has 19th-century doorways and a pantiled roof. Inside there is evidence of a pointed arch containing a piscina with trefoil head, and a large aumbry at the east end of the south wall. The opening at the east end on the north wall is also possibly an aumbry. There is evidence of ridge and furrow fields remaining in Walworth Park which may be associated with this settlement. In 2007 there was a watching brief when an electricity supply trench was dug in the middle of the lost settlement site, just north-east of the farm buildings, but no archaeological evidence was found.

References

External links

 Map of Walworth
 Old map of Walworth: 1896–1913

Villages in County Durham
Places in the Borough of Darlington
Places in the Tees Valley